FC Dinamo Yeghvard, is a defunct Armenian football club from Yeghvard, Kotayk Province. The club was formed in 2002 and participated in the Armenian First League during the same year. However, the club was dissolved in 2003 prior to the kick-off of the First League.

League record

References

Association football clubs established in 2002
Association football clubs disestablished in 2003
Dinamo Yeghvard
2002 establishments in Armenia
2003 disestablishments in Armenia